Earl of Northesk is a title in the Peerage of Scotland. It was created in 1662 for John Carnegie, who notably served as Sheriff of Forfarshire. He was given the subsidiary title of Lord Rosehill and Eglismauldie (or Inglismaldie) at the same time. Carnegie had already been created Earl of Ethie and Lord Lour in 1647 but relinquished those titles in exchange for the 1662 creations. For the purposes of precedence and seniority, the earldom of Northesk is treated as having been created in 1647, the date of the creation of the earldom of Ethie.

Lord Northesk's great-grandson, the fourth Earl, sat in the House of Lords as a Scottish representative peer from 1708 to 1715. His younger son, the sixth Earl, was an admiral in the Royal Navy. He was succeeded by his son, the seventh Earl. He was also an admiral in the navy and was third in command at the Battle of Trafalgar. Lord Northesk was also a Scottish representative peer between 1796 and 1807 and 1830 and 1831. His grandson, the ninth Earl, was a Scottish representative peer from 1885 to 1891. He was succeeded by his son, the tenth Earl, who served as a Scottish representative peer from 1900 to 1921. His son, the eleventh Earl, was a Scottish representative peer from 1959 to 1963, when all Scottish peers were given an automatic seat in the House of Lords.

The eleventh Earl was succeeded by his first cousin, the twelfth Earl. He was the son of the Hon. Douglas Carnegie, second son of the ninth Earl. The fourteenth Earl was one of the ninety elected hereditary peers that were allowed to remain in the House of Lords after the passing of the House of Lords Act 1999, and sat on the Conservative benches. When he died without surviving male issue in 2010, the line of the third Earl failed, and the titles passed to his eighth cousin once removed, the fifteenth Earl, who is a writer and a descendant of the second Earl.

David Carnegie, 1st Earl of Southesk, was the elder brother of the first Earl. Another member of the Carnegie/Carnegy family was Elizabeth Carnegy, Baroness Carnegy of Lour. She was a descendant of the Hon. Patrick Carnegie of Lour, third son of the second Earl of Northesk, and a great-great-granddaughter of Major-General Alexander Carnegie (1793–1862) through his first son, making her a third cousin of the fifteenth Earl.

The earldom is named after the River North Esk in Angus. The family seat was Ethie Castle, near Arbroath, Scotland.

Earl of Northesk (1647/1662)
John Carnegie, 1st Earl of Northesk (c. 1580 – 1667)
David Carnegie, 2nd Earl of Northesk (b. 1627 – 1679)
David Carnegie, 3rd Earl of Northesk (1643–1688)
David Carnegie, 4th Earl of Northesk (1675–1729)
David Carnegie, 5th Earl of Northesk (1701–1741)
George Carnegie, 6th Earl of Northesk (1716–1792)
David Carnegie, Lord Rosehill (1749–1788)
William Carnegie, 7th Earl of Northesk (1756–1831)
George Carnegie, Lord Rosehill (1791–1807)
William Hopetoun Carnegie, 8th Earl of Northesk (1794–1878)
George John Carnegie, 9th Earl of Northesk (1843–1891)
David John Carnegie, 10th Earl of Northesk (1865–1921)
David Ludovic George Hopetoun Carnegie, 11th Earl of Northesk (1901–1963)
John Douglas Carnegie, 12th Earl of Northesk (1895–1975)
Robert Andrew Carnegie, 13th Earl of Northesk (1926–1994)
David John MacRae Carnegie, 14th Earl of Northesk (1954–2010)
Alexander Carnegie, Lord Rosehill (1980–2001)
Patrick Charles Carnegy, 15th Earl of Northesk (born 1940)

The heir presumptive is the present holder's brother, Colin David Carnegy (born 1942).
The heir presumptive's heir apparent is his son, Charles Alexander Carnegy (born 1975).
The heir presumptive's heir apparent's heir apparent is Patrick James Frederick Alexander Carnegy (born 2014).

Male-line family tree

See also
Earl of Southesk
Carnegie (disambiguation)

Notes

External links
Earl of Northesk Open Rights Group

References
Kidd, Charles, Williamson, David (editors). Debrett's Peerage and Baronetage (1990 edition). New York: St Martin's Press, 1990, 

People associated with Angus, Scotland
Earldoms in the Peerage of Scotland
Noble titles created in 1662
Noble titles created in 1647